The Luoyang dialect is a dialect of Zhongyuan Mandarin spoken in Luoyang and nearby parts of Henan province. 

The old Luoyang dialect served as one of historical standards of Chinese from the Warring States period into the Ming Dynasty, which distinguish from the modern Luoyang dialect. It is because Luoyang switched from Southern to Northern Mandarin over history. According to Lü Shuxiang (1985), "In Northern Song dynasty, the dialects at the Central Plains are still in the southern variety [of Mandarin]; the predecessor of modern Northern Mandarin began as a tiny regional dialect near Khanbaliq".

Phonology

Initials

Finals

Features

The Middle Chinese entering tone has a different distribution in the Luoyang dialect than in Standard Mandarin. (See entering tone for more.)
Tone contours are different from those in Standard Mandarin.
The retroflex and alveolar fricatives are found in different distributions: retroflex fricatives in Standard are often fronted to alveolar fricatives in Luoyang.
The retroflex series is less retroflexed than in Standard Mandarin and slightly further forward.
The alveolo-palatal series is slightly further back than in Standard Mandarin.
Standard final  nasalizes the preceding vowel in the Luoyang Dialect.
The -儿 suffix is pronounced .

Notes

Footnotes

Citations

References

Mandarin Chinese
Articles containing video clips